McClusky may refer to:

McClusky (surname)
McClusky, North Dakota, city in Sheridan County, North Dakota
McClusky Township, North Dakota, township in Sheridan County, North Dakota
McClusky Municipal Airport
 USS McClusky (FFG-41), a United States Navy frigate

See also
 Mclusky, Welsh rock band